The  Biltmore Theater may refer to:
Samuel J. Friedman Theatre in Manhattan, Broadway theatre formerly known as the Biltmore Theater
Biltmore Theater, Los Angeles, a former theatre associated with the Los Angeles Biltmore Hotel; open from 1924 through 1967